S7000 may refer to :
 EV-S7000, a Hi8 VCR
 Fujifilm FinePix S7000, a 6.3 megapixels digital camera
 Saipem 7000, a 1986 crane vessel, the second largest in the world

See also
 S7000A, property tax law in New York City